Richard Morrison may refer to:

 Richard Morrison (ambassador) (c. 1513–1556), Edward VI's ambassador to Charles V
 Richard Morrison (architect) (1767–1849), Irish architect
 Richard Morrison (film titles designer) (born 1953), English designer of film title sequences
 Richard Morrison (music critic), music critic of The Times 
 Richard Morrison (Neighbours), a character from the soap opera Neighbours
 Richard James Morrison (1795–1874), English astrologer
 Richard T. Morrison (born 1967), United States Tax Court judge